

Current squad
As of 18 July 2014

Transfers and loans

In

Out

Pre-season and friendlies

UEFA Europa League

Second qualifying round

Israel League Cup [Toto cup]

Group C

Hapoel Be'er Sheva
Hapoel Be'er Sheva F.C. seasons